Los Romanes is a hamlet in the municipality of La Viñuela in the province of Málaga in the autonomous community of Andalusia in southern Spain. 

Populated places in the Province of Málaga